Manasseh Ishiaku (born 9 January 1983) is a Nigerian former professional footballer who played as a striker.

While at La Louvière he helped them win the 2002–03 Belgian Cup, scoring twice in the final. Four years later he scored the winning goal in the final of the same competition, this time for Club Brugge.

Honours
La Louvière
Belgian Cup: 2002–03

Club Brugge
Belgian Super Cup: 2005
Belgian Cup: 2006–07

References

External links
 
 
 

1983 births
Living people
Sportspeople from Port Harcourt
Nigerian footballers
Association football forwards
Shooting Stars S.C. players
New South Wales Institute of Sport alumni
K.S.V. Roeselare players
R.A.A. Louviéroise players
Club Brugge KV players
MSV Duisburg players
1. FC Köln players
Sint-Truidense V.V. players
Belgian Pro League players
Bundesliga players
Nigeria international footballers
Nigerian expatriate footballers
Expatriate soccer players in Australia
Expatriate footballers in Belgium
Expatriate footballers in Germany
Nigerian expatriate sportspeople in Australia
Nigerian expatriate sportspeople in Belgium
Nigerian expatriate sportspeople in Germany